Aktion Deutschland Hilft e.V. – Bündnis deutscher Hilfsorganisationen (ADH) (Campaign Germany helps association -  alliance of German aid organisations) is a connection of German aid agencies for humanitarian aid, with the target of helping faster and more efficiently through coordination and combination of efforts in case of a disaster and to raise donations together. The association is headquartered in Bonn.

History

In Germany 
Aktion Deutschland Hilft was founded in 2001 with headquarters in Cologne, to combine the capabilities of German aid organisations, so that fast and efficient disaster aid can be guaranteed abroad. Reasons for action are wars and conflicts, famines, earthquakes, floodings, emergencies concerning the environment and other unpredictable disasters. In June 2006 the alliance moved to Bonn.

Aktion Deutschland Hilft includes 24 German aid organizations, which raise donations together and coordinate their measures.

Areas of disaster relief 
Aktion Deutschland Hilft is activated after a decision from its member organisations. Examples of disasters it responded to include the 2003 invasion of Iraq, the War in Darfur (August 2004), the 2004 Indian Ocean earthquake and tsunami, the 2005 Kashmir earthquake, the 2006 Pangandaran earthquake and tsunami, the 2007 African floods, the 2007 Tabasco flood and cyclones in Bangladesh (March 2008) and Myanmar (May 2008). In 2009 Aktion Deutschland Hilft was active for refugees in Sri Lanka (May), and victims of an earthquake in Indonesia in August and October as well as for people hit by the 2009 West Africa floods. In 2010 there was action for 2010 Haiti earthquake, the 2010 Chile earthquake and the 2010 Pakistan floods. In 2011 the alliance took action for the victims of 2011 Tōhoku earthquake and tsunami and the 2011 East Africa drought. In 2012 the alliance was busy with the 2012 Sahel drought and Refugees of the Syrian Civil War. The year 2013 was dominated by 2013 European floods, the 2013 North India floods and Typhoon Haiyan on the Philippines.

Organization

Leadership 
The patron of ADH is the former Federal President Horst Köhler.

ADH additionally has a board of trustees. These trustees get elected for three years by the general assembly.
 Minister of State Frank-Walter Steinmeier is heading the board of trustees.
 Ruprecht Polenz, MoP for the CDU and spokesman of the foreign committee of the Bundestag is vice-chairman.
Further members of the board of trustees (As of December 2015)

Membership 
In 2014 Aktion Deutschland Hilft had the following member-organizations:
 action medeor
 ADRA Deutschland
 Arbeiter-Samariter-Bund Deutschland
 AWO International
 CARE Germany-Luxemburg
 Habitat for Humanity
 Help – Hilfe zur Selbsthilfe (help people to help themselves)
 Islamic Relief
 Johanniter-Unfall-Hilfe
 Malteser Germany
 Der Paritätische Wohlfahrtsverband
 arche noVa
 Bundesverband Rettungshunde Search and rescue dogs
 DEMIRA Deutsche Minenräumer
 Friends of Waldorf Education
 Hammer Forum
 Handicap International
 HelpAge Deutschland
 Kinderhilfswerk Global-Care (help for children)
 LandsAid
 Solidaritätsdienst International
 Terra Tech
 World Vision Deutschland
 Zentralwohlfahrtsstelle der Juden in Deutschland (Jewish helping organization)

Membership is open to all charitable organizations located in Germany as long as they fulfill the membership criteria and keep its standards. Associated members of the ADH are the Bundesverband Digitale Wirtschaft and the People's Solidarity.

Quality-standards in disaster-help 
Member organisations are subjected to national and international accepted norms and agreements, for example:
 Codex of the International Red Cross and Red Crescent Movement
 "Twelve basic rules of German humanitarian aid abroad" of the German government,
 "Sphere Project" (Humanitarian Charter and Minimum Standards in Disaster Response)
 "NGDO-Charter", Basic Principles of Development and Humanitarian Aid NGOs in the European Union.
 "Initiative Transparente Zivilgesellschaft" of Transparency International
All financed projects are audited by external controllers.

Self-concept 
Aktion Deutschland Hilft aims to get disaster relief quickly to the victims and tailored to the mission. In the disaster zone there is close cooperation between the organizations to guarantee maximum outcome.

Donations 
The cooperation helps member organizations to reduce costs and to provide the maximum amount of donations direct into the projects. Common advertisement and one bank connection help to achieve this goal. The costs and incomes get split between the organizations. Additional to that a supportive membership of individuals is possible.

References

External links 
 Aktion Deutschland Hilft

Charities based in Germany
Humanitarian aid organizations
Medical and health organisations based in Bonn
Organizations established in 2001